Total West was a transport company in Western Australia.

History
In 1981, Westrail sough expression of interest to handle small freight traffic. Total West commenced operating on 1 July 1982 as a joint venture between Mayne Nickless and Westrail, each owning 50%. It was formed to transport mail and less than wagon load traffic.

In 1985, Mayne Nickless sold its stake to Gascoyne Trading Company. Gascoyne's 50% stake was included in its sale to Wesfarmers in 1996, who purchased Westrail's stake later the same year. Wesfarmers merged Total West and Gascoyne Trading Company under the Wesfarmers Transport brand. It was included in the 2001 sale of Wesfarmers road transport interests to Toll Holdings.

References

Companies based in Western Australia
Defunct transport companies of Australia
Transport companies established in 1982
Transport companies disestablished in 1996
Trucking companies in Australia
Wesfarmers
Westrail
1982 establishments in Australia
1996 disestablishments in Australia